Trichromia sanguipuncta is a moth in the family Erebidae. It was described by William Schaus in 1901. It is found in Venezuela and Ecuador.

References

Moths described in 1901
sanguipuncta